The Rheinufer Tunnel ( or "Rhine Bank Tunnel") is a road tunnel in Düsseldorf, Germany. The tunnel is part of the B1 German federal road.

The tunnel runs under the Rhine Promenade near the right hand bank of Rhine. The impressive southern entrance of the tunnel is marked by a tall building, the Düsseldorf Stadttor (city gate). The northern entrance is just south of the Oberkassel Bridge.

See also
Kunst im Tunnel

Transport in Düsseldorf
Buildings and structures in Düsseldorf
Road tunnels in Germany
Tunnels completed in 1993